Julia Kirt (born October 7, 1973) is an American politician who has served in the Oklahoma Senate from the 30th district since 2018.

References

1973 births
Living people
Democratic Party Oklahoma state senators
21st-century American politicians
21st-century American women politicians
Women state legislators in Oklahoma